Mario Moschi (6 May 1896 – 26 May 1971) was an Italian sculptor. His work was part of the sculpture event in the art competition at the 1936 Summer Olympics.

References

1896 births
1971 deaths
20th-century Italian sculptors
20th-century Italian male artists
Italian male sculptors
Olympic competitors in art competitions
People from Lastra a Signa